Countess Agatha Christine of Hanau-Lichtenberg (23 September 1632 in Buchsweiler (now Bouxwiller in France) – 5 December 1681 in Straßburg (now Strasbourg, in France); buried in Lützelstein (now La Petite-Pierre, France)) was a daughter of Count Philip Wolfgang (1595-1641) and his wife, Countess Johanna of Oettingen (1602-1639).

Agatha Christine died on 5 December 1681 and, like many of her children and later her husband, she was buried in the parish church of Lützelstein.

Marriage and issue 
She married on 4 July 1648 in Bischweiler to Count Palatine Leopold Louis of Veldenz (1 February 1623 –  in Strasbourg; also buried in Lützelstein) and had the following children:
unnamed daughter (1649-1649 in Lauterecken)
Anne Sophie (20 May 1650 in Lauterecken – 12 June 1706 in Morchingen (now Morhange, France), also buried in Lützelstein)
Gustav Philip (17 July 1651 in Lauterecken – 24 August 1679, allegedly murdered in Lauterecken; buried in the Lutheran church in Lauterecken)
Elisabeth Johanna (22 February 1653 in Lauterecken – 5 February 1718 in Morchingen; buried in Diemeringen), married on 27 July 1669 to Wild- and Rhinegrave John XI of Salm-Kyrburg (d. 16 September 1688 in Flonheim; buried in the town church in Kirn)
Christine (29 March 1654 in Lauterecken – 18 February 1655 in Lützelstein)
Christine Louise (11 November 1655 in Lützelstein – 14 April 1656, ibid.)
Christian Louis (5 October 1656 in Lützelstein – 15 April 1658, ibid.)
Dorothea (16 January 1658 in Lützelstein – 17 August 1723 in Strasbourg; buried in the parish church of Lützelstein), married on 10 July 1707 in Zweibrücken to Count Palatine Gustav of Kleeburg and Zweibrücken (1670-1731), divorced on 23 April 1723
Leopold Louis (14 March 1659 in Lützelstein – 17 March 1660 in Lützelstein; buried in Lützelstein)
Charles George (27 May 1660 in Lützelstein – 3 July 1686 outside Budapest)
Agatha Eleanore (29 June 1662 in Lützelstein – 1 January 1664, ibid.)
Augustus Leopold (22 December 1663 in Lützelstein – 9 September 1689 outside Mainz), was a colonel in the Bavarian army and was buried in the St. John's church in Hanau

Ancestors

References 
Detlev Schwennicke: Europäische Stammtafeln: Stammtafeln zur Geschichte der Europäischen Staaten, new series, vol. I.1, table 103
 Reinhard Suchier: Genealogie des Hanauer Grafenhauses, in: Festschrift des Hanauer Geschichtsvereins zu seiner fünfzigjährigen Jubelfeier am 27. August 1894, Hanau, 1894
 Ernst J. Zimmermann: Hanau Stadt und Land, 3rd ed., Hanau, 1919, reprinted: 1978

1632 births
1681 deaths
People from Bas-Rhin
Countesses Palatine of the Holy Roman Empire
House of Hanau
17th-century German people